This article shows the main career statistics of former tennis player Billie Jean King.

Grand Slam finals

Singles: 18 (12 titles, 6 runners-up)

Doubles: 29 (16 titles, 13 runners-up)

Mixed doubles: 18 (11 titles, 7 runners-up)
By winning the 1968 Australian Championships title, King became the 7th player to complete the mixed doubles career Grand Slam.

Grand Slam tournament timelines

Singles

Note: The Australian Open was held twice in 1977, in January and December.

See also 
 Singles performance timelines for all female tennis players who reached at least one Grand Slam or Olympic final

Women's doubles

Note: The Australian Open was held twice in 1977, in January and December.

Mixed doubles

Note: The Australian Open was held twice in 1977, in January and December.

Grand Slam singles records

Australian Championships/Open

King's overall win–loss record at the Australian Championships/Open was 16–4 .800 in 5 years (1965, 1968, 1969, 1982, 1983).  (Her win total does not include any first round byes.)

King was 1–1 in finals, 2–1 in semifinals, and 3–1 in quarterfinals.

King was 5–1 in three set matches, 11–3 in two set matches, and 1–0 in deuce third sets, i.e., sets that were tied 5–5 before being resolved.

King was seeded all 5 years she entered the tournament.
Seeded #1 overall in 1969 (losing finalist), 1968 (champion).
Seeded #2 foreign in 1965 (semifinalist).
Seeded #7 overall in 1983 (lost 2nd round).
Seeded #9 overall in 1982 (quarterfinalist).

King was 6–3 .667 against seeded players and 10–1 .909 against unseeded players.

Versus #1 seeds (domestic, foreign, or overall), King was 0–1 (Margaret Court (1965)).
Versus #2 seeds (domestic, foreign, or overall), King was 0–2 (Chris Evert 1982, Margaret Court (1969)).
Versus #3 seeds (domestic, foreign, or overall), King was 2–0 (Ann Haydon-Jones (1969), Judy Tegart Dalton (1968)).
Versus #4 seeds (domestic, foreign, or overall), King was 1–0 (Robyn Ebbern (1965)).
Versus #6 seeds (domestic, foreign, or overall), King was 1–0 (Karen Krantzcke (1969)).
Versus #7 seeds (domestic, foreign, or overall), King was 2–0 (Barbara Potter (1982), Margaret Court (1968)).

Against her major rivals at the Australian Championships/Open, King was 1–0 versus Kerry Melville Reid, 1–0 versus Judy Tegart Dalton, 1–0 versus Evonne Goolagong Cawley, 1–0 versus Ann Haydon-Jones, 1–2 versus Margaret Court, and 0–1 versus Chris Evert.

French Championships/Open

King's overall win–loss record at the French Championships/Open was 22–6 .786 in 7 years (1967–1970, 1972, 1980, 1982).  (Her win total does not include any first round byes but does include one walkover.)

King was 1–0 in finals, 1–1 in semifinals, and 2–4 in quarterfinals.  She failed to reach the quarterfinals only once, in 1982 when she lost to Lucia Romanov in the third round.

King was 3–3 in three set matches, 19–3 in two set matches, and 1–0 in deuce third sets, i.e., sets that were tied 5–5 before being resolved.

King was seeded all 7 years she entered the tournament.
Seeded #1 in 1968 (semifinalist), 1967 (quarterfinalist).
Seeded #2 in 1980 (quarterfinalist), 1970 (quarterfinalist), 1969 (quarterfinalist).
Seeded #3 in 1972 (champion).
Seeded #10 in 1982 (lost third round).

King was 5–3 .625 against seeded players and 17–3 .850 against unseeded players.

Versus #1 seeds, King was 1–0 (Evonne Goolagong Cawley (1972)).
Versus #5 seeds, King was 0–2 (Dianne Fromholtz Balestrat (1980), Nancy Richey Gunter (1968)).
Versus #6 seeds, King was 1–0 (Virginia Wade (1972)).
Versus #7 seeds, King was 1–1 (win: Helga Niessen Masthoff (1972); loss: Helga Niessen Masthoff (1970)).
Versus #8 seeds, King was 1–0 (Maria Bueno (1968)).
Versus #16 seeds, King was 1–0 (Gail Sheriff Chanfreau Lovera (1967)).

Against her major rivals at the French Championships/Open, King was 1–0 versus Virginia Wade, 1–0 versus Maria Bueno, 1–0 versus Evonne Goolagong Cawley, 1–1 versus Helga Niessen Masthoff, 0–1 versus Lesley Turner Bowrey, and 0–1 versus Nancy Richey Gunter.

Wimbledon

King's overall win–loss record at Wimbledon was 96–15 .865 in 21 years (1961–1975, 1977–1980, 1982–1983).  (Her win total includes one walkover but does not include any first round byes.)

King was 6–3 in finals, 9–5 in semifinals, and 14–6 in quarterfinals.  King failed to reach the quarterfinals only once, in 1961 during her first Wimbledon.  After receiving a bye during the first round, King lost to the fifth seed, Yola Ramírez Ochoa, in the second round.

King was 23–7 in three set matches, 73–8 in two set matches, and 5–1 in deuce third sets, i.e., sets that were tied 5–5 before being resolved.

King was seeded 18 times out of 21 years.  (Wimbledon seeded 8 players from at least 1961 through 1976, 12 players in 1977, and 16 players from 1978 through the end of King's career.)
Seeded #1 in 1974 (quarterfinalist), 1968 (champion), 1967 (champion).
Seeded #2 in 1973 (champion), 1972 (champion), 1971 (semifinalist), 1970 (losing finalist), 1969 (losing finalist).
Seeded #3 in 1975 (champion) and 1964 (semifinalist).
Seeded #4 in 1966 (champion).
Seeded #5 in 1980 (quarterfinalist), 1978 (quarterfinalist), 1977 (quarterfinalist), 1965 (semifinalist).
Seeded #7 in 1979 (quarterfinalist).
Seeded #10 in 1983 (semifinalist).
Seeded #12 in 1982 (semifinalist).
Unseeded in 1963 (losing finalist), 1962 (quarterfinalist), 1961 (lost second round).

King was 31–15 .674 against seeded players.  She never lost to an unseeded player (65–0).  Her worst loss was to #8 seed Olga Morozova in 1974.

Versus #1 seeds, King was 4–7 (wins: Chris Evert (1975), Evonne Goolagong Cawley (1972), Margaret Court (1966, 1962); losses: Martina Navratilova (1980), Chris Evert (1978, 1977), Margaret Court (1970, 1964, 1963), Maria Bueno (1965)).
Versus #2 seeds, King was 2–1 (wins: Maria Bueno (1966), Lesley Turner Bowrey (1963); loss: Chris Evert (1982)).
Versus #3 seeds, King was 6–2 (wins: Tracy Austin (1982), Evonne Goolagong Cawley (1973), Virginia Wade (1970), Ann Haydon-Jones (1967, 1963), Lesley Turner Bowrey (1965); losses: Andrea Jaeger (1983), Evonne Goolagong Cawley (1971)).
Versus #4 seeds, King was 3–2 (wins: Evonne Goolagong Cawley (1975), Chris Evert (1973), Ann Haydon-Jones (1968); losses: Tracy Austin (1979), Ann Haydon-Jones (1969)).
Versus #5 seeds, King was 0–2 (Ann Haydon-Jones (1962), Yola Ramírez Ochoa (1961)).
Versus #6 seeds, King was 4–0 (Wendy Turnbull (1982), Rosemary Casals (1972), Annette Van Zyl DuPlooy (1966), Ann Haydon-Jones (1964)).
Versus #7 seeds, King was 8–0 (Wendy Turnbull (1983), Olga Morozova (1975), Kerry Melville Reid (1973), Virginia Wade (1972), Françoise Dürr (1971), Karen Krantzcke (1970), Judy Tegart Dalton (1968), Maria Bueno (1963)).
Versus #8 seeds, King was 3–1 (wins: Judy Tegart Dalton (1969), Lesley Turner Bowrey (1968), Virginia Wade (1967); loss: Olga Morozova (1974)).
Versus #14 seeds, King was 1–0 (Sue Barker (1978)).

Against her major rivals at Wimbledon, King was 4–2 versus Ann Haydon-Jones, 3–0 versus Rosemary Casals, 3–0 versus Virginia Wade, 3–0 versus Françoise Dürr, 3–1 versus Evonne Goolagong Cawley, 3–1 versus Maria Bueno, 2–3 versus Margaret Court, 2–3 versus Chris Evert, 1–0 versus Christine Truman Janes, 1–0 versus Hana Mandlíková, 1–1 versus Olga Morozova, 1–1 versus Tracy Austin, and 0–1 versus Martina Navratilova.

United States Championships/Open

King's overall win–loss record at the United States Championships/Open was 58–14 .806 in 18 years (1959–1969, 1971–1974, 1977, 1979, 1982).  She was 50–11 on grass, 5–2 on hard courts, and 3–1 on clay.  (Her win total does not include any first round byes.  Her loss total includes two retirements.)

King was 4–2 in finals, 6–1 in semifinals, and 7–3 in quarterfinals.

King was 8–4 in three set matches, 50–10 in two set matches, and 4–1 in deuce third sets, i.e., sets that were tied 5–5 before being resolved.

King was seeded 14 times out of the 18 years she entered the tournament.
Seeded #1 in 1973 (lost third round), 1972 (champion), 1971 (champion), 1968 (losing finalist), 1967 (champion).
Seeded #2 in 1974 (champion), 1966 (lost second round).
Seeded #3 in 1969 (quarterfinalist), 1964 (quarterfinalist), 1963 (lost fourth round).
Seeded #5 in 1965 (losing finalist).
Seeded #7 in 1977 (quarterfinalist).
Seeded #9 in 1979 (semifinalist).
Seeded #12 in 1982 (lost first round).
Unseeded in 1962 (lost first round), 1961 (lost second round), 1960 (lost third round), 1959 (lost first round).

King was 12–8 .600 against seeded players and 46–6 .895 against unseeded players.

Versus #1 seeds, King was 0–3 (Chris Evert (1979 and 1977), Margaret Court (1965)).
Versus #2 seeds, King was 3–0 (Rosemary Casals (1971), Ann Haydon-Jones (1967), Maria Bueno 1965).
Versus #3 seeds, King was 1–0 (Ann Haydon-Jones (1965)).
Versus #4 seeds, King was 1–1 (win: Virginia Wade (1979); loss: Christine Truman Janes (1961)).
Versus #5 seeds, King was 3–1 (wins: Evonne Goolagong Cawley (1974), Margaret Court (1972), Maria Bueno (1968); loss: Nancy Richey Gunter (1964)).
Versus #6 seeds, King was 1–2 (win: Rosemary Casals (1974); losses: Nancy Richey Gunter (1969), Virginia Wade (1968)).
Versus #7 seeds, King was 0–1 (Bernice Carr Vukovich (1960)).
Versus #8 seeds, King was 1–0 (Virginia Wade (1972)).
Versus #9 seeds, King was 2–0 (Kerry Melville Reid (1977 and 1972)).

Against her major rivals at the United States Championships/Open, King was 3–1 versus Virginia Wade, 2–0 versus Maria Bueno, 2–0 versus Ann Haydon-Jones, 2–0 versus Rosemary Casals, 1–0 versus Evonne Goolagong Cawley, 1–0 versus Françoise Dürr, 1–1 versus Margaret Court, 1–2 versus Chris Evert, 0–1 versus Christine Truman Janes, and 0–2 versus Nancy Richey Gunter.

Career finals

Singles (183)

Wins (129)

1 The crowd of 7,000 booed when a tiebreak was announced at 12–12. Both King and Jones refused to play a tiebreak, and a happy crowd got its money's worth. King got a standing ovation when she won the 17–15 set.
2 This was the first important clay court title of King's career.
3 With this tournament championship, King became the first woman ever to win more than U.S.$100,000 in prize money during a calendar year.
4 This victory snapped Gunter's 13-match winning streak on indoor clay courts.

Runners-up (54)

Women's doubles

Wins

Runners-up

Year end singles rankings

E = excluded from the rankings, because she was a contract professional player (1968–69), had retired (1975), or for unknown reasons (1983).
N = not ranked in top ten.
C = co-ranked U.S. No. 1 with Nancy Richey.

1 The world rankings in this table are from Lance Tingay of the London Daily Telegraph for 1959 through 1967 and from Bud Collins for 1968 through 1983.
2 King was ranked behind Margaret Court, Lesley Turner Bowrey, and Maria Bueno.
3 King was ranked behind Court, Bueno, and Bowrey.
4 King was ranked behind Court and Ann Haydon-Jones.
5 King was ranked behind Court.
6 King was ranked behind Chris Evert.
7 The Women's Tennis Association (WTA) rankings began in 1975.
8 The U.S. rankings are from the United States Tennis Association.
9 King was ranked behind Darlene Hard, Karen Hantze Susman, and Richey.
10 King was ranked behind Hard and Susman.
11 King was ranked behind Hard.
12 King was ranked behind Richey.
13 King was ranked behind Martina Navratilova, Evert, and Tracy Austin.
14 King was ranked behind Evert, Virginia Wade, and Navratilova.

References

Tennis career statistics
Billie Jean King